"Strawberry Spring" is a horror short story by Stephen King. It was originally published in the Fall 1968 issue of Ubris magazine, and collected in King's Night Shift in 1978.

Plot
"Strawberry Spring" takes place at a fictional New England college, New Sharon College.  The main setting for the story is March 1968, specifically starting on March 16, 1968.

An unnamed narrator sees the words "Springheel Jack" in a newspaper.  It rekindles memories of a time about eight years previously when he was at New Sharon College.  His recollections are nostalgic, almost melancholy.

It was March 16, 1968 when the strawberry spring, a "false" spring much like an Indian summer, arrived.  It brought a thick fog that covered the campus at nighttime, providing perfect cover for a serial killer called "Springheel Jack".  The body of a girl was found in a parking lot, the first murder in a series. Several more female students were murdered during the strawberry spring. The narrator describes the reactions of the college community throughout this time, and the contradicting rumors that spread about the victims. The police arrested Gale Cerman's boyfriend, Carl Amalara, for the crimes.  Another murder was committed while Amalara was in custody, and the police were forced to release him. The investigation was made more difficult by the fearful panic of police officers, security guards (an incident is recounted in which an unconscious student is misidentified as a corpse by a terrified security guard), and the students. No legitimate suspects were found.

Eight years later, a new strawberry spring arrives, and so does "Springheel Jack", who has taken another victim at New Sharon College. The narrator realizes that he is Springheel Jack despite having no memories of his actions.

Characters 
John Dancey- The college student who discovers the body of the first murder victim

Gale Cerman (pronounced Kerr-man)- First victim, killed 16 March 1968, the only victim who's body was fully intact

Carl Amalara- Gale's ex-boyfriend, originally accused of murder because of the bad breakup, and the evidence found in his dorm (7 inch L.L. Bean hunting knife, destroyed photos of Gale). He was released the next day.

Ann Bray- Second victim whose head was missing from her body and never found

Donald Morris- College student who was thought to be dead, but was actually just unconscious due to the flu

Adelle Parkins- Third victim, killed in her 1964 Dodge, "HA HA" written in her blood on the car window

Hanson Gray- An "innocuous homosexual sociology graduate student" who was arrested out of hysteria, then released

Marsha Curran- Fourth victim, killed at the mall

Adaptation 
In 2021 Audio Up Media and iHeart Media released a podcast adaptation of the short story. Lee Metzger served as the producer for the series, which ran for eight episodes starting in September 2021. The series marked the first time that one of King's works was officially adapted in podcast form. The podcast starred Garrett Hedlund as the protagonist and narrator for the series, as well as Milo Ventimiglia, Herizen F. Gaurdiola, Sydney Sweeney, Ken Marino, Al Madrigal, and Brec Bassinger.

The podcast retains the setting and time period of the original story while expanding it to include information about the narrator, additional characters, and backstory to the narrator's life. The story follows Henry through the 60s, while he was a student, and in the 70s, after he became a professor. It follows him as he investigates the murders in both time periods while also reflecting on his time in an orphanage, after the death of his mother and brother in a car accident while they were driving through a similar strawberry spring. It is eventually revealed that Henry is the murderer, killing while in a dissociative state caused by the car accident, which he finds was caused by his abusive father chasing after his mother while she tried fleeing for their safety. It is heavily implied that Henry murdered his mother by breaking her neck as an act of mercy, as she was severely injured by the accident. The series ends with Henry murdering one of the people who were aware that he is the killer and him vowing to kill another who he suspects already knows, while also celebrating the birth of his new daughter.

See also
 Stephen King short fiction bibliography

References

External links

Stephen King Short Movies

Short stories by Stephen King
1978 short stories
Horror short stories
Works originally published in Ubris